Arthur Freeman (15 October 1871 – 30 November 1948) was an English cricketer. He was a fast bowler who played for Somerset. He was born in Iron Acton and died in Bath.

Freeman made one first-class appearance, against Sussex during the 1905 season. Batting in the tailend, Freeman scored 3 runs in the only innings in which he batted.

External links
Arthur Freeman at Cricket Archive 

1871 births
1948 deaths
English cricketers
Somerset cricketers
People from Acton, London